Porochilus is a genus of eeltail catfishes native to Australia and New Guinea.

Species
There are currently four recognized species in this genus:
 Porochilus argenteus (Zietz (fi), 1896) (Silver tandan)
 Porochilus meraukensis (Weber, 1913) (Merauke tandan)
 Porochilus obbesi Weber, 1913 (Obbes' catfish)
 Porochilus rendahli (Whitley, 1928) (Rendahl's catfish)

Description 
P. meraukensis grows to 24 centimetres (9 in) TL, while P. obbesi grows to 12 cm (5 in) TL.

Habitat 
P. meraukensis is found in quiet backwaters or in well vegetated, swampy lagoons and lakes. P. obbesi lives in slow-flowing streams, backwaters, swamps and lily lagoons, usually among aquatic weeds such as eelgrass; it is also found in lakes. P. obbesi feeds on insects, prawns and mollusks.

References

Plotosidae

Taxa named by Max Carl Wilhelm Weber
Freshwater fish genera
Catfish genera